Royal Air Force Andrews Field or more simply RAF Andrews Field (also known as RAF Andrewsfield and RAF Great Saling) is a former Royal Air Force station located  east-northeast of Great Dunmow Essex, England.

Originally designated as Great Saling when designed and under construction, the base was renamed "Andrews Field" in honour of United States Army Air Forces (USAAF) General Frank M. Andrews, who was killed in an aircraft crash in Iceland in May 1943. Andrews Field was primarily the home of the USAAF Ninth Air Force 322d Bombardment Group during the Second World War, which flew the Martin B-26 Marauder medium bomber.  After being transferred to the Air Ministry in late 1944, it was used briefly by RAF Fighter Command for Gloster Meteor jet fighter testing before being finally closed in late 1945.

Today the remains of the airfield are located on private property, which is used for agricultural, with a small portion used by the Andrewsfield Flying Club.

History

Andrews Field was the first of fourteen "Type A" airfields built by the United States Army Air Forces in the United Kingdom during the Second World War. Originally designated as "Great Saling", the facility was built by the United States Army 819th Engineer Battalion (Aviation), which began work on the field during July 1942.

Andrews Field had three runways, a main of 1,830m aligned 09/27 and two crosswind secondary runways of 1,280m aligned 02/20 and 15/33. It had an enclosing perimeter track that had three separate dispersal areas totaling 50 loop type hardstands and one "frying pan" type. Barracks facilities for about 3,000 personnel were constructed along with a technical site that had two T-2 type hangars for aircraft maintenance. Main construction was supposed to be completed in early January 1943, and it continued until March.

United States Army Air Forces use
On 21 May 1943 the official name was changed to Andrews Field in honour of Lieutenant General Frank M Andrews. Andrews Field was known as USAAF Station AAF-485 for security reasons by the USAAF during the war, by which name it was referred to instead of location. Its USAAF Station Code was "GZ". Although the name Andrews Field (or Andrewsfield) appears on RAF air maps and was widely used by that service, some USAAF agencies still referred to the airfield by the name Great Saling.

USAAF Station Units assigned to RAF Andrews Field were: 
 42d Service Group (VIII Air Force Composite Command)
 356th, 361st Service Squadron, HHS, 42d Service Group 
 18th Station Complement Squadron
 21st Weather Squadron
 28th Mobile Reclamation and Repair Squadron
Regular Army Station Units included:
 1020th Signal Company
 1136th Quartermaster Company
 1175th Military Police Company
 1642nd Ordnance Supply & Maintenance Company
 2253rd Quartermaster Truck Company
 819th Chemical Company (Air Operations)
 878th Signal Depot Company
 2044th Engineer Fire Fighting Platoon
 111th Army Postal Unit
 201st Medical Dispensary
 Weather Detachment BB, 21st Weather Squadron

96th Bombardment Group (Heavy)

When opened in January 1943, Andrews Field was assigned to the VIII Bomber Command of Eighth Air Force, however it didn't receive its first combat group until May, when the 4th Bombardment Wing 96th Bombardment Group (Heavy) flying Boeing B-17 Flying Fortresses arrived from RAF Grafton Underwood (AAF-106) in Northamptonshire.

The group consisted of the following squadrons:
 337th Bombardment Squadron (AX)
 338th Bombardment Squadron (BX)
 339th Bombardment Squadron (QJ)
 413th Bombardment Squadron (MZ)

The 96th appears to have only carried out one mission while posted to Andrews Field.  On 29 May 1943 they took part in a raid on Rennes naval storage depot from which one B-17 failed to return. The group was moved to RAF Snetterton Heath on 12 June 1943 in a general exchange of airfields with Martin B-26 Marauder 3d Bombardment Wing groups.

322d Bombardment Group (Medium)

Replacing the 96th was the 322d Bombardment Group (Medium) which arrived from RAF Bury St. Edmunds on 12 June. The group was assigned to the 3d Bomb Wing and flew Martin B-26B/C Marauders. Operational squadrons of the 322d were:
 449th Bombardment Squadron (PN)
 450th Bombardment Squadron (ER)
 451st Bombardment Squadron (SS)
 452d Bombardment Squadron (DR)
 1st Pathfinder Squadron (Provisional) (Attached) (1H)

The 322nd was the first B-26 group to enter combat (in May 1943) from the UK, during which its combat performance helped to prove the effectiveness of the medium bombers flying tactical combat missions.

In common with other Marauder units of the 3rd Bomb Wing, the 322d was transferred to Ninth Air Force on 16 October 1943. The group attacked enemy airfields in France, Belgium, and the Netherlands attacking the principal targets but the group also attacked secondary targets such as power stations, shipyards, construction works, and marshalling yards.

Beginning in March 1944 the 322nd bombed railway and highway bridges, oil tanks, and missile sites in preparation for the invasion of Normandy.

On 8 May 1944, one of the 322nd aircraft, nicknamed "Mild and Bitter" (serial 41-31819) became the first B-26 flying from England to complete 100 combat missions.  Another B-26, "Flak Bait" (41-31773) survived to the end of hostilities with 202 missions to its credit, the only US bomber involved in combat over Europe to pass the 200 mark.

On D-Day, 6 June 1944 the 322d Bomb Group attacked coastal defences and gun batteries.  Afterwards, during the Normandy campaign, the 322nd pounded fuel and ammunition dumps, bridges, and road junctions, supporting the Allied offensive at Caen and the breakthrough at Saint-Lô in July.

From Andrews Field the 322d received a Distinguished Unit Citation for the period 14 May 1943 – 24 July 1944. The group moved during September 1944, transferring to Beauvais (A-61) Airfield in northern France, and aiding the drive of Third Army across France. On the continent, the 322nd BG used the following Advanced Landing Grounds:
 Beauvais/Tille Airfield (A-61), France September 1944
 Le Culot Airfield (A-89), Belgium March 1945
 Fritzlar Airfield (Y-86), Germany June - November 1945

The 322d flew its last mission on 24 April 1945. After V-E Day, the group was assigned to occupation duty in Germany beginning in June 1945, engaging in inventorying and disassembling German Air Force equipment and facilities. Returned to the Camp Kilmer, New Jersey in December 1945, and was inactivated on 15 December.

 1st Pathfinder Squadron (Provisional) 

The 1st Pathfinder Squadron (Provisional) was formed at Andrews Field in February 1944 and equipped with B-26s, carrying the Oboe radio transponder blind-bombing device. When the unit was formed the squadron consisted of 14 aircraft.  The squadron was attached to the 322nd Bombardment Group, but provided bad weather leads for all IX Ninth Bombing Command groups.

The first B-26 night mission was flown by the 1st Pathfinder Squadron on the night of 1 June 1944 when three B-26's bombed gun positions at St Marie au Bois, France. This was purely a Pathfinder mission and no other unit participated. On the night of 8 July 1944, using Oboe, the 322d undertook a night mission but nine of its aircraft fell victim to Luftwaffe fighters. At the end of hostilities the squadron strength was 36 B-26's.

RAF Fighter Command use
Unlike most of the airfields vacated by the Ninth Air Force in the area, Andrews Field was immediately returned to RAF Fighter Command control on 7 October - to provide an airfield for North American Mustang squadrons escorting Bomber Command daylight operations being used by 11 Group, Air Defence of Great Britain (ADGB).   At this time the airfield was also under consideration for extension of runways to house Very Heavy Boeing B-29 Superfortress bombers.

Within a week the HQ of No. 150 (Polish) Wing RAF and an advance party of No. 19 Squadron moved in. By the middle of October 1944, Nos. 19, 65 and 122 Squadrons (No. 122 Wing) had joined the Polish Wing consisting of Nos. 129, 306 and 315 Squadrons.

At the end of February 1945 the Gloster Meteor III jet fighters of 616 Squadron arrived, they stayed for a month before being replaced by a detachment of Meteor IIIs from 504 Squadron.

In addition to the combat squadrons, the Air Sea Rescue Supermarine Walruses of 276 Squadron, RAF Coastal Command were resident from early June 1945. They left for Kjevik, Norway on 23 August.

With the end of the war, No 303 Squadron departed in December 1945 and the airfield was placed under care and maintenance and became a satellite of RAF Great Sampford in 1946.

Current use
With the end of military control, Andrews Field was virtually abandoned by 1948 and soon took on an air of neglect.  In common with other disused airfields, some of the buildings were taken over as temporary housing, even as late as 1953.  From there on, virtually all the buildings with the exception of the two T-2 hangars and most of the ground works (runways, etc.) were removed and the land reverted to agriculture.

In 1972, aircraft again returned to Andrews Field (renamed Andrewsfield Aerodrome) when a 915m grass strip along part of the line of the original main runway was constructed.  As flying increased, a clubhouse and flying control were erected in 1975 for the Andrewsfield Flying Club. The airfield was licensed by the CAA in 1976.

The Rebel Air Museum was housed in a blister hangar near the clubhouse for some time, until it moved to new premises on Earls Colne airfield.

Other than the two T2 hangars, the firing-in butts and a few Nissen huts in the dispersed sites, little remains of the once-busy wartime airfield. Only a small amount of single track perimeter remains along the south side of the airfield, although the wartime runways are visible as disturbed earth in aerial photography. There are two memorials, one in the village is positioned in front of the former Sick Quarters Site and commemorates the 819th Aviation Engineer Battalion who built the airfield.  The other memorial is along the lane from the A120 to Great Saling and is to the memory of the 322nd Bomb Group (M).  A mural depicting a B-26 adorns an interior wall of the Andrewsfield Flying Club clubhouse.  Also on display are a number of photographs showing the airfield under construction.

Andrewsfield is also a source for BBC Weather readings for the local area quoted on their website.

Units assigned

 Royal Air Force
 HQ, No. 133 Wing (10–24 October 1944)
 129 Squadron (10 October - 12 December 1944)
 306 Squadron (10 October 1944 – 10 August 1945)
 315 Squadron (Polish) (10–24 October 1944, 15 January - 8 August 1945)
 19 Squadron (14 October 1944 – 13 February 1945)
 65 Squadron (14 October 1944 – 16 January 1945, 6–15 May 1945)
 122 Squadron (14 October 1944 – 1 May 1945)
 HQ, No 150 Wing (15 October - 23 December 1944)
 316 Squadron (24 October 1944 – 16 May 1945, 10 August - 17 September 1945, 5 October - 28 November 1945)
 309 Squadron (12 December 1944 – 10 August 1945)
 616 Squadron (28 February – 31 March 1945)
 303 Squadron (Polish) (4 April – 16 May 1945, 9 August - 28 November 1945)
 276 Squadron (8 June - 23 August 1945)
 2766 Squadron RAF Regiment
 2769 Squadron RAF Regiment
 No. 1 Aircraft Delivery Flight RAF

 United States Army Air Forces
 96th Bombardment Group, (13 May - 11 June 1943)
 332nd Bombardment Group, (12 June 1943 – 25 September 1944)

See also

List of former Royal Air Force stations
Frank Maxwell Andrews

References

Citations

Bibliography

 Freeman, Roger A. (1991) The Mighty Eighth: The Colour Record. Cassell & Co. 
 Freeman, Roger A. (1994) UK Airfields of the Ninth: Then and Now 1994. After the Battle 
 Freeman, Roger A. (1996) The Ninth Air Force in Colour: UK and the Continent-World War Two. After the Battle 

 Ravenstein, Charles A. (1984). Air Force Combat Wings Lineage and Honors Histories 1947-1977. Maxwell AFB, Alabama: Office of Air Force History. .
 British Automobile Association (AA), (1978), Complete Atlas of Britain,

External links

  Current-Day photos of the remnants of RAF Andrews Field
 322d Bomb Group website
 Andrewsfield Aviation
 Photographs of RAF Andrews Field  from the Geograph British Isles project

Royal Air Force stations in Essex
Airfields of the VIII Bomber Command in Essex
Airfields of the 9th Bombardment Division in the United Kingdom
Royal Air Force stations of World War II in the United Kingdom